The Sacramento Adult Soccer League (SASL) is an amateur soccer league located in Sacramento, California.  The SASL is affiliated with the United States Adult Soccer Association (USASA) Region IV - California Soccer Association - North which stands as the 6th tier of the United States Soccer League System.  Often teams are affiliated with local bars or clubs in and around Sacramento.  The league has a Spring and Fall Season and holds and annual tournament known as the Gold Cup which is the largest men's adult soccer tournament in Sacramento.

Organization 
The SASL generally consists of an 18 & Over Division, 40 & Over Division and a 50 & Over Division.  Depending on the number of teams, these divisions are sometimes split into a 1st and 2nd division with relegation and promotion.  In the past the league has included other age brackets.

External links 
 Official Website

Soccer leagues in the United States
Regional Soccer leagues in the United States